Jacob Timothy Bird (born December 4, 1995) is an American professional baseball pitcher for the Colorado Rockies of Major League Baseball (MLB). He played college baseball for the UCLA Bruins, and led the Pac-12 Conference in ERA in 2018. He was selected by the Rockies in the fifth round of the 2018 Major League Baseball draft. He made his MLB debut in 2022. Bird committed to play for the Israel national baseball team in the 2023 World Baseball Classic, to be held in March 2023.

Early life
Bird was born in Newhall, California, to Joel and Heidi Bird, was raised in Valencia, California, and is Jewish. He has one older brother, Josh, and two younger brothers, Travis and Trent.

When Bird was eight years old, at the end of second grade he signed his friends' yearbooks as follows: "Save this autograph for when I’m playing in the major leagues."

Amateur career
Bird attended West Ranch High School in Stevenson Ranch, California, pitching and playing outfield for the baseball team, and playing for the basketball team. In his senior year of high school he pitched to a 1.55 ERA with 72 strikeouts and 11 walks over 58 innings. He was an All-Foothill League selection in 2014.  He committed to attend the University of California, Los Angeles (UCLA) to play college baseball for the UCLA Bruins during his senior year.

Unselected in the 2014 Major League Baseball draft, he enrolled at UCLA, majoring in economics. In 2016, he played collegiate summer baseball with the Falmouth Commodores of the Cape Cod Baseball League, going 3–2 with a 2.77 ERA as a starter. As a junior he was 5–5 with a 2.75 ERA. His pitching repertoire consisted of a heavy sinker that reached 94 mph, a hard slider in the 86-88 mph range, a changeup, and a curveball.

As a senior at UCLA in 2018, he compiled a 7–4 record and started 16 games, leading the Pac-12 Conference with a 2.18 ERA, and striking out 61 batters over  innings. He said: "I'm just trying to pitch contact. My stuff is pretty heavy ... which gets a lot of ground balls... (Just) let the defense do their thing."  He was named All-Pac-12, Pac-12 All-Academic first team, and Academic All-America third team. Following the season, he was selected by the Colorado Rockies in the fifth round of the 2018 Major League Baseball draft.

Professional career
Bird signed with the Rockies for a signing bonus of $50,000. He made his professional debut in 2018 with the Grand Junction Rockies of the Rookie-level Pioneer League, going 4–1 with a 3.38 ERA and 30 strikeouts over  innings pitched in relief. In 2019, he played with the Asheville Tourists of the Class A South Atlantic League, with whom he earned mid-season All-Star honors. He went 7–2 with two saves and a 3.62 ERA and 80 strikeouts in 40 games (second in the league) over 97 innings. 

To begin the 2021 season, he was assigned to the Hartford Yard Goats of the Double-A Northeast, where he induced a 70.9% ground ball rate. He was then promoted to the Albuquerque Isotopes of the Triple-A West in early June. Over 39 appearances between the two clubs, Bird went 6–1 with a 3.38 ERA and 59 strikeouts over  innings. He pitched as a reliever in the Arizona Fall League for the Salt River Rafters after the season, and was 0–1 with a save and a 2.84 ERA. 

He returned to the Isotopes to begin the 2022 season. There, before he was called up he had a 2.77 ERA with 34 strikeouts in 26 innings over 22 games, and induced a 64.4% ground ball rate.

On June 11, 2022, the Rockies selected Bird's contract and promoted him to the major leagues. He made his MLB debut on June 16, throwing one scoreless inning in relief versus the Cleveland Guardians. With the Rockies in 2022, he was 2–4 with a 4.91 ERA in 47.2 innings over 38 games.

International career

Bird committed to play for the Israel national baseball team in the 2023 World Baseball Classic, to be held in March 2023. He will be playing for Team Israel manager Ian Kinsler, and alongside All Star outfielder Joc Pederson and starting pitcher Dean Kremer, among others.

Pitching repertoire
Bird is a ground ball pitcher with a low-slot, sidearm delivery. His sinker averages 95.3 mph, and has significant tailing action, inducing ground balls. He throws a low-90s cutter, and a breaking ball at 81-83 mph.

References

External links

1995 births
Living people
Baseball players from California
Jewish American baseball players
Jewish Major League Baseball players
People from Valencia, Santa Clarita, California
Major League Baseball pitchers
People from Newhall, Santa Clarita, California
Sportspeople from Los Angeles County, California
Colorado Rockies players
UCLA Bruins baseball players
Falmouth Commodores players
Grand Junction Rockies players
Asheville Tourists players
Hartford Yard Goats players
Albuquerque Isotopes players
Salt River Rafters players